Fioralba is a feminine given name. Notable people with the name include:

 Fioralba Cakoni, American-Albanian mathematician
 Fioralba Disdari, 2013 Miss Universe Albania
 Fioralba, a character in the 1642 opera Il palazzo incantato

Feminine given names